The 2013 Major League Ultimate season was the inaugural season for the league. The season began on April 20, 2013 and concluded on July 13, 2013 with the Championship between the Boston Whitecaps and the San Francisco Dogfish. Each team played a 10-game schedule. This season had the first and only team, to date, to go completely undefeated as the Boston Whitecaps went 12-0, including playoffs.

The official uniform manufacturer was Five Ultimate.

Standings
<small>Q indicates a team qualified for the playoffs. H indicates home field advantage in the conference finals.

Playoffs

Top scorers

Source:

Most Valuable Players

References

Major League Ultimate